Boxing is a popular sport in Wales, and since the early 20th century Wales has produced a notable number of professional boxers including several World Champions. The most notable boxers include Wales' first World Champion Percy Jones; Jimmy Wilde, who is seen as pound-for-pound one of the World's finest boxers and Joe Calzaghe, who ended his career an undefeated World Champion.

The early history of boxing in Wales
Despite the sport of boxing in Wales being heavily identified with the industrial south, it was a common pastime in pre-industrial Wales around the country; and was patronized by the local gentry. In the late 18th century, boxing became more commercialised with promoters and publicans organising paid matches that attracted spectators, and with them heavy betting. In 1797 the skilful 'Whitechapel Jew', Daniel Mendoza fought in a match near Neath and 1819 saw exhibition bouts staged by two of England's greatest bare-knuckle boxers, Tom Cribb and Tom Spring. One of the more common ways for the Welsh public to watch a fight was at race meets. Boxing had always been associated with horse racing, and according to the Racing Calendar the favoured Welsh courses were Brecon, Carmarthen, Knighton, Wrexham and Monmouth. In 1824 the 4,000 racing pundits at Monmouth were also entertained with a fight in which a quarryman called Parry beat Powell in a 103-round contest. The early 19th century also witnessed the emergence of Welsh boxers whose fame extended beyond the confines of the boxing rings. One of the first Welsh fighters of note, despite being born in Southwark in London, was Ned Turner. Turner's parents were both from Montgomeryshire and he was dubbed the "pugilistic prince of Wales' by the North Wales Gazette in 1823. 
  
The opening of the South Wales Valleys to industrialisation in the mid-1800s saw a large influx of commercial immigration. This was followed by an improved transport network, which in turn allowed larger crowds, and larger wagers, to be brought to the sport of boxing. When the Taff Vale Railway was extended to Merthyr Tydfil in 1840, the locals celebrated by a contest between Cyfarthfa champion John Nash, and Merthyr hardman Shoni Sguborfawr. The adoption of boxing as a sport for the underprivileged in industrial Wales is compared, by Welsh historian Gareth Williams, to the living conditions of the emerging towns themselves. Towns like Merthyr, one of the heartlands of the world's iron industry, with its dire health and living conditions, along with a high rate of industrial injury and death, reinforced in the minds of the working class that life was short and brutal. The sport of boxing, though exploitative of the common man, was still a means to rise above the poverty of everyday life and glamourized the primitive.

In 1867, Wales made its first major contribution to boxing, when Llanelli-born sportsman and sport organiser John Graham Chambers devised and drafted the Queensbury Rules, the basic code to which boxing still practices under to this day. Although boxing now had its legitimate code of laws, Wales would often be the location of illegal bare-knuckled fights, and there would be known mountainside locations where locals would meet to watch fights. These illegal fights were often conducted at dawn in isolated or remote areas, though they were still sometimes disrupted by the law. To evade criminal proceedings, fights were often arranged on land near county borders where jurisdiction was vague and law enforcement intermittent. In particular the area between Tafarnaubach near Tredegar and Llangynidr in Powys became the 'nursery for would-be champions' due to its proximity to the borders of three counties. Towards the end of the Victorian period several Welsh boxers, who made their name as mountain fighters, began fighting under Queensbury rules and became well known and respected sportsmen. Among their number were champion fighters, John O'Brien, Dai St. John, Redmond Coleman and butcher brothers Sam and Ivor Thomas. By the early 20th century, boxing had not advanced to a great degree in Wales, and many of the country's early professional boxers began their career fighting in booths at fairgrounds. With the popularity of the sport increasing, a scale of weights and titles evolved, which allowed the emergence of working-class local heroes.

20th century boxing in Wales

In the first third of the 20th century the South Wales valleys produced a prolific stream of boxing champions. The valleys area around Pontypridd produced more champions during this period than any region of a comparable size in the world. The champions included three boxers from the Rhondda; Tom Thomas of Penygraig, Percy Jones of Porth and Jimmy Wilde from Tylorstown, and Pontypridd's own Freddie Welsh and Frank Moody. All these boxers fought with a particular 'Welsh' stance, upright, and using a combination of fast two-fisted attacks. Of these fighters, Jimmy Wilde stands out as a true great of World boxing, whose diminutive stature and light frame hid an incredible punching power, that was reflected in one of his nicknames, 'The Ghost with the Hammer in his Hand'. Wilde fought over 150 professional bouts, losing just five, and achieved 99 knockouts. Although the coalfields and ironworks of South Wales produced notable fighters, other areas of South Wales also produced memorable fighters. The darling of Cardiff was 'Peerless' Jim Driscoll, who took the featherweight Lonsdale belt in 1910. Other boxers who were able to translate success in Britain abroad, included Gipsy Daniels who fought at Madison Square Garden and Bill Beynon who took the Empire Bantamweight title.

In April 1928 the Welsh Boxing Association and Control Board was set up to regulate championships and ensure the safety of the boxers in Wales. It initially attempted to remain independent of the British Boxing Board of Control (BBBC), with whom it had had some disputes, but by 1929 it had amalgamated with the newly reconstituted BBBC, and after that Welsh boxing was managed by the Welsh Area Council. The Welsh Board set about forming a championship for each weight division, and by 1929 all eight weights had a recognised Welsh champion. With the championship formed, the titles could now only be won in a Board of Control designated contest. Although Wales was now recognised within the BBBC as one of the eight areas of their control, the Welsh champions were regarded as representing their country rather than just an administrative area.

Despite the popularity of team sports in Wales such as rugby union and football, boxing as a solo sport was integral to regional culture in Wales and extremely popular with the working classes. Even when Welsh economic fortunes slumped during the depression in the 1930s, boxing retained popular support, though the number of world championship titles faded. Two Welsh boxers of note emerged during this period, Jack Petersen, who won the British Heavyweight Championship on two occasions and the 'Tonypandy Terror', Tommy Farr, who took the Empire heavyweight crown. Although Farr never achieved the success of previous Welsh boxers, his struggle as a professional fighter, especially his 1937 15 round defeat to Joe Louis, was seen to mirror the struggle of the Welsh workers.

Post World War II, Wales produced another round of championship contenders, though as with the previous decade they failed to emulate the Welsh boxers of the 1920s. Ronnie James of Pontardawe, Dai Dower of Abercynon and Colin Jones of Gorseinon all held British titles but did not win a world title belt. The later half of the 20th century saw a string of Welsh boxers who engaged the Welsh psyche, with a centred group of fighters coming from the Merthyr area. These Merthyr boxers included welterweight Eddie Thomas, featherweight Howard Winstone and bantamweight Johnny Owen, who lost his life in a fight against Lupe Pintor in 1980.

Welsh boxing in the twentieth century produced a number of notable light and middle weight boxers, but failed to have a similar impact on the heavyweight categories, which was not reflective of the rest of the United Kingdom. The notable exceptions to this were the Dick Richardson of Newport and Joe Erskine from Cardiff, who, along with England's Henry Cooper and Brian London formed a quartet of promising British heavyweights during the late 1950s and early 1960s.

The final decade of the twentieth century saw four Welshmen take World Championship titles. Steve Robinson became the WBO Featherweight Champion in 1993, followed by Robbie Regan (WBO World Bantamweight) in 1996, Barry Jones (WBO World Super-Featherweight) and Joe Calzaghe (WBO Super Middleweight), both in 1997.

21st century boxing in Wales
The first decade of the 21st century of boxing in Wales was dominated by a single fighter, Joe Calzaghe. Although Calzaghe came to note after beating former Middleweight World Champion Chris Eubank on points in 1997 to win the WBO title, it was during the 2000s that he came to prominence. Calzaghe finished his career with 46 bouts and no losses, one of the few World Champions to retire undefeated.

Other boxers of note to emerge during the early 21st century include, Jason Cook who became European Lightweight Champion in 2002, Nathan Cleverly the European, British, Commonwealth and WBO World light heavyweight title holder, Gavin Rees former WBA light-welterweight champion and Enzo Maccarinelli former WBO and WBU cruiserweight champion.

Welsh boxing champions

Wales Area boxing champions

British boxing champions from Wales

European boxing champions from Wales

World boxing champions from Wales

NWS: Newspaper decisions

Notes

Bibliography